Moron was an ancient city mentioned by Strabo. Several hypotheses exist related to its location, but a location near Santarém is strongly considered.

Strabo mentions that Decimus Junius Brutus Callaicus made camp on an island near the city identified as modern Almourol on the river Tagus.

Another hypothesis points to Alpiarça.

References

 Roman towns and cities in Portugal